Thoracotremata is a clade of crabs, comprising those crabs in which the genital openings in both sexes are on the sternum, rather than on the legs. It comprises 17 families in four superfamilies .

Evolution
Thoracotremata is the sister group to Heterotremata within the clade Eubrachyura, having diverged during the Cretaceous period.  Eubrachyura itself is a subset of the larger clade Brachyura, which consists of all "true crabs".  A summary of the high-level internal relationships within Brachyura can be shown in the cladogram below:

The internal relationships within Thoracotremata are less certain, with many of the superfamilies found to be invalid.  The proposed cladogram below is from analysis by Tsang et al, 2014:

Superfamilies and families

Ocypodoidea
Camptandriidae
Dotillidae
Heloeciidae
Macrophthalmidae
Mictyridae
Ocypodidae
Ucididae
Xenophthalmidae
Pinnotheroidea
Pinnotheridae

Cryptochiroidea
Cryptochiridae
Grapsoidea
Gecarcinidae
Glyptograpsidae
Grapsidae
Plagusiidae
Sesarmidae
Varunidae
Xenograpsidae

However, recent studies have found the superfamilies Grapsoidea and Ocypodoidea to be polyphyletic and invalid.

References

Crabs